Pulaski County Special School District No. 1 (PCSSD) is one of four public school districts in Pulaski County, Arkansas—along with the Little Rock School District, the North Little Rock School District, and the Jacksonville North Pulaski School District—accredited by the Arkansas Department of Education. PCSSD has its headquarters in Sweet Home, an unincorporated area near southeastern Little Rock; the headquarters has a Little Rock postal address.

The current Pulaski County Special School District was established on July 21, 1927, by referendum pursuant of Act 152 of the 1927 Arkansas Acts by the Arkansas legislature joining thirty-eight independent school districts into a "special" school district. As of 2019–20, PCSSD has the sixth-highest student enrollment in the state. Geographically, PCSSD is the state's fifth largest district and encompasses a total , and includes most areas of the county—incorporated and unincorporated—excluding most areas within the city limits of Little Rock, Cammack Village, most areas within the city of North Little Rock, Jacksonville, and a section of McAlmont.

History

LRSD vs. PCSSD (Desegregation) 
Prior to July 1, 2016, the three school districts within the county—Little Rock School District (LRSD), North Little Rock School District (NLRSD), and Pulaski County Special School District (PCSSD)—have been involved in a desegregation case that the courts determined were unconstitutionally segregated and placed under court supervision since 1982.   The Pulaski County Special School District had a segregated administrative structure well into the late 1970s.  Viola Harris was the Assistant Superintendent for the segregated schools located in the rural predominantly Black communities of Pulaski County encompassing College Station, Sweet Home, Pankey, McAlmont and others.  The Black teachers and principals reported to Viola Harris, and were paid significantly less than their white counterparts in the Pulaski County Special School District.  The current Harris Elementary School was named to honor Viola Harris and her dedication to the education of Black students in the rural communities of Pulaski County.  Students in the Black Schools received the discarded and outdated textbooks from the white schools in the PCSSD. The desegregation litigation sought remedies for these historical disparities.

After numerous actions were satisfied, the courts determined that LRSD to be unitary (or integrated) and generally coterminous with Little Rock's boundaries. In doing so, these actions led to the annexation of J. A. Fair High School and other schools from PCSSD to LRSD in 1987. In 2007, the courts determined that all actions by LRSD were completed and that court supervision continues until NLRSD and PCSSD actions are completed.

PCSSD school board dissolved 
On May 19, 2011, the court determined that PCSSD had not completed nine of twelve actions required by court supervision with regards to being unitary in the desegregation case.

On June 20, 2011, the Arkansas Department of Education abolished and dissolved the PCSSD School Board and fired its current superintendent, Dr. Charles Hopson amid alleged financial troubles and the aforementioned lack of completing required desegregation actions. This also lead to the state department taking over the school district.

Service area 
This district boundary includes, in addition to the Sweet Home CDP, the entirety of the Pulaski County municipalities of Maumelle, Sherwood (including the former Gravel Ridge CDP), and Wrightsville, as well as portions of Little Rock and North Little Rock. It also includes the portion of Alexander in Pulaski County, which is an exclave.

It also includes the census-designated places of Sweet Home, College Station, Hensley, Landmark (formerly Parkers-Iron Springs), Natural Steps, Roland, and Woodson, as well as portions of McAlmont and the Pulaski County portion of Scott. Other unincorporated areas include  Crystal Hill, and Ironton.

The district extends into Saline County, where it serves a portion of Shannon Hills, into Lonoke County, which includes its portion of Scott CDP, and into Faulkner County.

Enrollment 

Since 1997–98, PCSSD has served approximately 17,500 to 20,000 students each year supported by approximately 1,100 to 1,400 full time equivalent teachers, with a steady reduction of the pupil/teacher ratio from 16.60 to 1 (1997–98) to 14.84 to 1 (2011–12).

Schools

High schools

The Pulaski County Special School District maintains four comprehensive public high schools. In 2011–12, PCSSD closed Oak Grove High School with the opening of the newly constructed Maumelle High School. The last school built in PCSSD prior to Maumelle High School was J. A. Fair High School, which subsequently moved to the Little Rock School District. Joe T. Robinson High School moved to new facilities starting in the 1981–82 school year. North Pulaski High School was established in 1977, Wilbur D. Mills High School opened in 1969, and Sylvan Hills High School was founded in 1956 and moved to newer facilities in November 1968. Jacksonville High School was originally located on the site of present-day Jacksonville Elementary. Next, JHS moved to 1320 School Drive (now serving as Jacksonville Middle School) until the start of the 1969–70 school year, when it moved to 2400 Linda Lane. Jacksonville High School was removed from the Pulaski County Special School District on July 1, 2016, as part of the formation of the Jacksonville North Pulaski School District.

A new campus for Wilbur D Mills High School was opened in August 2018. The school was built on the grounds that formerly held Fuller Middle School. The Fuller Middle School students moved into the old buildings of Mills High School, becoming Mills Middle School.

The assumed course of study for students at each high school follows the Smart Core curriculum developed by the Arkansas Department of Education (ADE), which requires each student to complete 22 units to graduate; 16 units are from the Smart Core and 6 units that are career focused in occupational pathway areas. According to the Arkansas Department of Career Education (ACE), the Standards of Accreditation of Public Schools require that each school offer three programs of study in three different occupational pathway areas.
 Wilbur D. Mills High School offered 13 programs of study in 13 different pathways.
 North Pulaski High School offered 12 programs of study in 12 different pathways.
 Joe T. Robinson High School offered 10 programs of study in 10 different pathways.
 Sylvan Hills High School offered 9 programs of study in 9 different pathways.
 Sylvan Hills Freshman Campus offered in 10 program 6 different pathways.

Middle schools

In fall 2011, a new  campus facility for Sylvan Hills Middle School opened for grades 6-8 students and staff, replacing the original high school (1955-1967) / middle school (1967-2011) facilities located adjacent to the Sylvan Hills High School and Sylvan Hills Elementary School campus.

In August 2018, Fuller Middle School moved into the old buildings of Mills High School, constructed in 1969. The school was renamed as Mills Middle. A new Robinson Middle School was also opened. Along with the new Mills High School, these schools cost about $80 million.

† denotes Title I school

Elementary schools

The Pulaski County Special School District operates 16 elementary schools including several magnet schools and specialty schools providing focus on particular subject areas.  In 2008, the William Jefferson Clinton Elementary Magnet School was named a National Blue Ribbon School, followed by a National Blue Ribbon School designation for Arnold Drive Elementary School in 2010.

Sherwood Elementary's Odyssey of the Mind team takes the Arkansas State Tournament and went to the World Finals. Also, Dupree Elementary received a National School of Distinction status from the Schools Fight Hunger program.

Harris Elementary School named in honor of Viola H. Harris, a former administrator of the district and McAlmont Elementary School, served as Pulaski Technical School before being renamed as Harris High School starting in the fall of 1963 and lasting until 1970 when the district reorganized its facilities as a result of desegregation and the facility became an elementary school. The high school's mascot of the Panthers remains today as Harris Elementary School's mascot.

† denotes Title I school

Former schools
Primarily as a result of desegregation or the need to replace aging facilities, numerous facilities have been renamed or closed including the following:

Former high schools
J. C. Cook High School (a Black school in Wrightsville) was closed as a result of desegregation and repurposed as an integrated J. C. Cook Elementary School until 1976.
 In 1963, Pulaski County Training School (a Black school) was renamed as Harris High School.
 In 1970, Harris High School was repurposed as Harris Elementary School.
 In 1971, McAlmont High School (grades 7–12) was closed as a result of desegregation.
 In 1987, J.A. Fair High School (opened in 1982), and John L. McClellan High School (opened in 1965) were annexed to Little Rock School District.
 In 2011, Oak Grove High School was closed as a result of opening nearby Maumelle High School.
 In 2016, North Pulaski High School was merged with Jacksonville High School as a part of the Jacksonville North Pulaski School District.
 The Sweet Home community had a high school populated by students from College Station Elementary School.

Former middle schools
 In 2001, Sylvan Hills Junior High School (grades 7–9) becomes Sylvan Hills Middle School (grades 6–8).
 In 2011, Sylvan Hills Middle School closes its facilities at 401 Dee Jay Hudson Drive; reopens for 2011–12 school year at its new facilities across AR Highway 107 at 10001 Johnson Street.
 In 2015 Northwood Middle School was repurposed as Sylvan Hills Freshman Campus due to a large portion of the student population being reallocated to the new Jacksonville North Pulaski School District.   The remainder were assigned to Sylvan Hills Middle School.
 Jacksonville Middle School is now in the Jacksonville North Pulaski School District.

Former elementary schools
 In 1971, McAlmont Elementary School is closed.
 In 1976, J. C. Cook Elementary School is closed.
 In 1987, Mabelvale Elementary School annexed to Little Rock School District with the opening of Daisy Bates Elementary School.
 In 2006, Homer Adkins Elementary School was converted into a Pre-K school
 In 2011, Jacksonville Elementary School is closed.
 In 2014, Scott Elementary is closed

References

Further reading
  (Download) - Includes boundary of the Pulaski County Special district in the 1950s, which differs from its current shape
  (Download) - Includes boundary of the Pulaski County Special district in the 1950s, which differs from its current shape
  (Download) - Includes boundary of the Pulaski County Special district in the 1950s, which differs from its current shape
  (Download) - Includes boundary of the Pulaski County Special district in the 1950s, which differs from its current shape

External links

 
 NCES Common Core of Data webpage
 ED/IES/NCES Report: Characteristics of the 100 Largest Public Elementary and Secondary School Districts in the United States: 2002–03 Appendix A. The 500 largest public school districts in the United States and jurisdictions, by school district: School year 2002–03

 
Education in Pulaski County, Arkansas
Education in Faulkner County, Arkansas
Education in Lonoke County, Arkansas
Education in Saline County, Arkansas
School districts in Arkansas
School districts established in 1927
1927 establishments in Arkansas
Education in Little Rock, Arkansas